Linn–Benton Community College (LBCC) is a public community college in Linn County, Oregon. The college offers more than 80 degree programs and certificates.

History

LBCC was established in 1966 with the purpose of supporting the citizens of Linn and Benton counties.

In the 1960s a community college was a conceptual idea, however, it wasn't until 1964 that a study was conducted to assess the need of such an institution. The results of this study showed that post-high school opportunities, educationally, were non-existent and that many graduating high school students were interested in a local community college.

It was then that Linn County asked for the support of Benton County in assistance for foundation of a college in the mid-Willamette Valley. This partnership reached success on December 6, 1966 when, by referendum vote, Linn and Benton County voters approved the formation of a college district by nearly 3:1.

The first classes began in 1967 during the same year LBCC started operations full-time. The campus headquarters was located on the corner of First St. and Ellsworth St., however, classes were offered at rented locations throughout the LBCC college district.

During this time, six occupational programs were offered. This included a sewage waste/treatment program that was described to be the "first of its kind offered in the country". Tuition was $60 per term.

In February 1970 a permanent campus was slated for construction based on a vote by voters in Linn and Benton counties. Voters agreed that bonds should be issued to pay for construction. The campus was dedicated in October 1974. Takena Hall, the campus student union was completed in 1979.

In May 1998, a dual enrollment program was established between Oregon State University and LBCC in the fields of agricultural sciences, business and engineering. This was extended to all programs in 1999.

Academics

LBCC is accredited by the Northwest Commission on Colleges and Universities. Lower division collegiate credits earned at LBCC may be transferred to any public university in Oregon. There is also a degree partnership with Oregon State University for those seeking a bachelor's degree.

Campuses

It comprises 13 brick buildings in the Brutalist style, and 7 additional contemporary buildings. These buildings are on the perimeter of a large courtyard, while a covered walkway connects the buildings and is adjacent to the courtyard. A geologic timeline covering Earth's history stretches along the sidewalk on the south side of the buildings.

To the West of the main brick structure is the gymnasium, and beyond that, a track field. To the Northwest is the campuses farming section, including a small vegetable garden.

Extension campuses
Besides the main Albany Campus, Linn–Benton Community College has three extension centers: The Benton Center, located in Corvallis, Oregon; the Lebanon Center; and the Sweet Home Center. These campuses serve students in rural areas and commonly offer many evening, weekend, and GED classes.

Student life 
The colors of LBCC are blue, gold and white. Its mascot is the roadrunner.  Before the current campus in Albany was dedicated in 1974, students were called roadrunners since the campus was scattered in several locations all over Albany, forcing students to commute between buildings across town.

See also 
 List of Oregon community colleges

References

External links
Official website

Community colleges in Oregon
Educational institutions established in 1966
Universities and colleges accredited by the Northwest Commission on Colleges and Universities
Education in Linn County, Oregon
1966 establishments in Oregon
Buildings and structures in Albany, Oregon